is a railway station in Chūō-ku, Kobe, Hyōgo Prefecture, Japan.

Overview
Kasuganomichi is an underground station. It is served by two side platforms serving two tracks.

Layout

History 
Kasuganomichi Station opened on the Hanshin Main Line on 12 April 1905.

The station was moved underground in 1934.

Once dubbed "Japan's scariest station", the layout built in 1934 was a single platform serving two tracks. Construction work on new side platforms concluded in September 2004.

Station numbering was introduced on 21 December 2013, with Kasuganomichi being designated as station number HS-31.

Gallery

References

External links 

 Station website (in Japanese)

Railway stations in Japan opened in 1905
Railway stations in Hyōgo Prefecture